The Shield of Achilles could refer to:
The Shield of Achilles described in Homer's Iliad
"The Shield of Achilles", a poem and collection of poems by W. H. Auden
The Shield of Achilles: War, Peace, and the Course of History, a book by Philip Bobbitt